The Max Born Medal and Prize is a scientific prize awarded yearly by the German Physical Society (DPG) and the British Institute of Physics (IOP) in memory of the German physicist Max Born, who was a German-Jewish physicist, instrumental in the development of quantum mechanics. It was established in 1972, and first awarded in 1973.

The terms of the award are that it is "to be presented for outstanding contributions to physics". The award goes to physicists based in Germany and in the UK or Ireland in alternate years. The prize is accompanied by a silver medal "about 6 cm in diameter and 0.5 cm thick. One face carries a profile of Max Born and his name and dates. The other face carries the equation pq – qp = h/2πi and the full names of IOP and DPG. The recipient's full name and year of award is engraved around the rim." The medal is accompanied by €3000.

List of recipients
The following have received this award:

1973 Roger Cowley
1974 Walter Greiner
1975 Trevor Moss
1976 Hermann Haken
1977 Walter Spear
1978 Herbert Walther
1979 John Taylor
1980 
1981 Cyril Domb
1982 Wolfgang Kaiser
1983 Andrew Keller
1984 
1985 George Isaak
1986 
1987 Cyril Hilsum
1988 Peter Armbruster
1989 Robert H. Williams
1990 
1991 Gilbert Lonzarich
1992 
1993 David C. Hanna
1994 Wolfgang Demtröder
1995 Michael H Key
1996 Jürgen Mlynek
1997 Robin Marshall
1998 Gerhard Abstreiter
1999 John Dainton
2000 
2001 Volker Heine
2002 
2003 Brian Foster
2004 Matthias Scheffler
2005 
2006 
2007 Alan D. Martin
2008 Hagen Kleinert
2009 Robin Devenish
2010 Simon White
2011 David Philip Woodruff
2012 Martin Bodo Plenio
2013 
2014 
2015 Andrea Cavalleri
2016 Christian Pfleiderer
2017 Carlos Silvestre Frenk
2018 Angel Rubio
2019 Michael Coey
2020 Anna Köhler
2021 Hiranya Peiris
2022 Claudia Felser

See also
 Institute of Physics Awards
 List of physics awards
 List of awards named after people

References 

Awards established in 1973
Awards of the Institute of Physics
Awards of the German Physical Society
Physics awards
Max Born